Florante "J.R." Valentin (born February 9, 1982, in Las Piñas) is a Filipino actor and model. He is best known for his role as Victor Perez, an idealistic police officer, in the 2005 drama The Blossoming of Maximo Oliveros.

Filmography

Television

Movies

References

External links
 
 

1982 births
Living people
Filipino male film actors
Star Magic
Filipino male television actors
Filipino television personalities